A list of films produced in the Soviet Union in 1949 (see 1949 in film).

1949

See also
1949 in the Soviet Union

External links
 Soviet films of 1949 at the Internet Movie Database

1949
Soviet
Films